C/1702 H1 (also known as "the comet of 1702") is a comet discovered by Maria Margaretha Kirch in Germany on April 20, 1702.

1702 apparition
Kirch discovered the comet on April 20, 1702. The comet was a short distance above the horizon and was said to resemble a "nebulous star".

An independent discovery was made by Philippe de La Hire (Paris, France) on April 24.

The last observation of the comet was made by Bianchini and Maraldi on May 5, 1702.

Orbit
Very similar parabolic orbits were computed for C/1702 H1 by Nicolas Louis de Lacaille (1761) and Johann Karl Burckhardt (1807).

Closest approaches to Earth
1702-04-20: 0.0435 AU from Earth

References
 

Non-periodic comets
1702 in science
17020420